The United Kingdom has participated in the biennial classical music competition Eurovision Young Musicians sixteen times since its debut in 1982, most recently taking part in  after a 8-year absence.

History 

BBC Young Musician (originally BBC Young Musician of the Year) is a televised national music competition, that inspired the creation of the Eurovision Young Musicians. Broadcast on BBC Television and BBC Radio 3 biennially, and hosted by the British Broadcasting Corporation (BBC), the competition, a former member of European Union of Music Competitions for Youth, is designed for British percussion, keyboard, string, brass and woodwind players, all of whom must be eighteen years of age or under on 1 January in the relevant year.

The competition was established in 1978 by Humphrey Burton and Walter Todds, both of whom are former members of the BBC Television Music Department. From 1982, the winner of the show often proceeded to represent the United Kingdom at the Eurovision Young Musicians.

Participation overview

Hostings

Commentators

See also 
BBC Young Musician
United Kingdom in the Eurovision Song Contest – Senior version of the Junior Eurovision Song Contest.
United Kingdom in the Eurovision Dance Contest – Dance version of the Eurovision Song Contest.
United Kingdom in the Eurovision Young Dancers – A competition organised by the EBU for younger dancers aged between 16 and 21.
United Kingdom in the Junior Eurovision Song Contest – Singing contest for children aged between 9 and 14.

References

External links 
  (BBC Television)
  (BBC Radio 3)
 Eurovision Young Musicians

Countries in the Eurovision Young Musicians